is a passenger railway station located in the city of Nagahama, Shiga, Japan, operated by the West Japan Railway Company (JR West).

Lines

Station layout
The station consists of one island platform connected to the station building by a footbridge. The station is staffed.

Platform

Adjacent stations

History
Yogo station opened on 1 October 1957 on the Japan National Railway (JNR).  The station came under the aegis of the West Japan Railway Company (JR West) on 1 April 1987 due to the privatization of  the JNR.

Station numbering was introduced in March 2018 with Yogo being assigned station number JR-A04.

Passenger statistics
In fiscal 2019, the station was used by an average of 160 passengers daily (boarding passengers only).

Surrounding area
Mount Shizugatake
Japan National Route 365

See also
List of railway stations in Japan

References

External links

0541408 JR West official home page

Railway stations in Shiga Prefecture
Railway stations in Japan opened in 1957
Hokuriku Main Line
Nagahama, Shiga